Très-Saint-Sacrement is a parish municipality located along the Chateauguay River in the Montérégie region of Quebec, Canada. The population as of the Canada 2011 Census was 1,155. Established in 1885, the municipality completely encloses the village of Howick, which was incorporated as a separate entity in 1915.

Geography

Communities
The following locations reside within the municipality's boundaries:
Allan's Corners – a hamlet located in the central portion along the Chateauguay River and Route 138.
Bryson – a hamlet located in the western portion along the Chateauguay River and Route 138.
Riverfield – a hamlet located south of Howick on Route 203.
Saint-Pierre – a hamlet located in the southwest portion.

Lakes & Rivers
The following waterways pass through or are situated within the municipality's boundaries:
English River (Chateauguay River tributary) (Mouth ) – feeds into Rivière Chateauguay.
Rivière Chateauguay – flows west to east through the municipality.

Demographics 

Transportation
The CIT du Haut-Saint-Laurent provides commuter and local bus services.

See also
 Le Haut-Saint-Laurent Regional County Municipality
 English River (Chateauguay River tributary)
 List of parish municipalities in Quebec

References

External links

Parish municipalities in Quebec
Incorporated places in Le Haut-Saint-Laurent Regional County Municipality